The Danish Thundersport Championship (DTC) was a Danish sports car racing series held from 2012 to 2019. It was administered by DTC Motorsport A / S (DTC A / S), and ran according to DASU regulations. The series featured American muscle cars of the CCRMK1 type. DTC took over the abbreviation from the Danish Touringcar Championship.

References

Motorsport competitions in Denmark
2012 establishments in Denmark